Wian van Vuuren (born 31 March 1993) is a Namibian cricketer.

Van Vuuren made his first-class debut for the side during the 2009-10 season, against Gauteng. He scored 2 runs in the first innings in which he batted, and 32 runs in the second. At 16 years and 226 days, he was one of the youngest ever players to represent Namibian national team in cricket.

External links
Wian van Vuuren at Cricinfo

1993 births
Living people
Cricketers from Windhoek
Namibian cricketers